William Sutherland Thatcher, M.C. (Liverpool, 10 December 1888 – Cambridge, 12 December 1966) was Censor of Fitzwilliam House, Cambridge from 1924 to 1954.

Thatcher  educated at Farnworth Grammar School, Liverpool College and Fitzwilliam House, Cambridge. On graduation he went as a lecturer in economics to the University of Allahabad. During World War I he served as an officer with the 10th Baluch Regiment. In 1918 he returned to Cambridge 1918 as a Lecturer in Geography.

References 

People educated at Farnworth Grammar School
People educated at Liverpool College
Alumni of Fitzwilliam College, Cambridge
Baloch Regiment officers
Censors of Fitzwilliam House, Cambridge
Academics of the University of Cambridge
Academic staff of the University of Allahabad
1966 deaths
1888 births
Recipients of the Military Cross